The 1998–99 season of the UEFA Cup Winners' Cup club tournament was the last season of the competition before it was abolished. Lazio won the final against Mallorca to earn their only title in the competition. Chelsea were the defending champions, but were eliminated in the semi-finals by Mallorca.

Teams

TH Title Holders

Qualifying round

|}

First leg

Second leg

Rudar Velenje won 2–0 on aggregate.

Helsingborg won 5–0 on aggregate.

Lausanne-Sport won 7–2 on aggregate.

CSKA Kyiv won 3–2 on aggregate.

Apollon Limassol won 5–4 on aggregate.

Genk won 9–1 on aggregate.

Haka won 3–0 on aggregate.

Levski Sofia won 9–2 on aggregate.

Liepājas Metalurgs won 4–3 on aggregate.

Rapid București won 8–2 on aggregate.

Hearts won 6–0 on aggregate.

Amica Wronki won 5–0 on aggregate.

MTK won 10–1 on aggregate.

Maccabi Haifa won 3–1 on aggregate.

Spartak Trnava won 3–0 on aggregate.

Copenhagen won 10–0 on aggregate.

Partizan won 2–1 on aggregate.

First round

|}

First leg

Second leg

Lokomotiv Moscow won 5–1 on aggregate.

Braga won 4–0 on aggregate.

Ried won 3–0 on aggregate.

Maccabi Haifa won 4–3 on aggregate.

Panionios won 5–1 on aggregate.

3–3 on aggregate; Apollon Limassol won on penalties.

3–3 on aggregate; Lazio won on away goals.

2–2 on aggregate; Partizan won on away goals.

Chelsea won 1–0 on aggregate.

Copenhagen won 6–1 on aggregate.

2–2 on aggregate; Vålerenga won on away goals.

Beşiktaş won 4–2 on aggregate.

Heerenveen won 4–1 on aggregate.

Varteks won 2–0 on aggregate.

The game was played in Brussels as Genk's stadium did not meet UEFA requirements.

Genk won 6–1 on aggregate.

Before the game, the Hearts delegate complained about the non-standard goal height, and the referee measured it to be 1 centimetre lower than regulation. Hearts agreed to play the game anyway.

Mallorca won 2–1 on aggregate.

Second round

|}

First leg

The game was played in Brussels as Genk's home stadium did not meet UEFA requirements.

Second leg

Lokomotiv Moscow won 3–2 on aggregate.

Maccabi Haifa won 5–3 on aggregate.

Panionios won 4–2 on aggregate.

Lazio won 3–2 on aggregate.

Chelsea won 2–1 on aggregate.

Vålerenga won 4–3 on aggregate.

Varteks won 5–4 on aggregate.

Genk raised an official protest, claiming that the corner locations are too close to the fence around the pitch. It was denied.

1–1 on aggregate; Mallorca won on away goals.

Quarter-finals

|}

First leg

Second leg

Lokomotiv Moscow won 4–0 on aggregate.

Lazio won 7–0 on aggregate.

Chelsea won 6–2 on aggregate.

Mallorca won 3–1 on aggregate.

Semi-finals

|}

First leg

Second leg

1–1 on aggregate; Lazio won on away goals.

Mallorca won 2–1 on aggregate.

Final

Top goalscorers
The top scorers from the 1998–99 UEFA Winners' Cup (including qualifying round) are as follows:

See also
 1998–99 UEFA Champions League
 1998–99 UEFA Cup
 1998 UEFA Intertoto Cup

Notes

References

External links 
 1998–99 competition at UEFA website
 results at Rec.Sport.Soccer Statistics Foundation
 Archive of old pages site UEFA Season 1998–1999, written protocol games. On the opened page should click on the word «Impatient»

3
1998-99